At WBAI's Free Music Store, 1971 (also released as N.Y.N.Y. 1971) is a live album by multi-instrumentalist and composer Joe McPhee recorded in 1971 and first released on the Swiss HatHut label in 1996.

Reception

The Allmusic review by Scott Yanow states "The six lengthy pieces (which are sandwiched by somewhat stilted announcing) are full of fire but also have their quiet and lyrical moments. A strong all-around performance that should not have taken 25 years to release". On All About Jazz, Nic Jones noted "this is a great opportunity to check in with McPhee on street level and follow his musical journey chronologically from there. Live a little and savour the challenge".

Track listing 
All compositions by Joe McPhee
 Announcement 1 - 0:33
 "Black Magic Man" - 6:25
 Announcement 2 - 0:35
 "Nation Time" - 14:12
 "Song for Lauren" - 13:17
 Announcement 3 - 0:33
 "Message from Denmark" - 13:39
 "The Looking Glass 1" - 16:01
 "Harriet" - 13:35

Personnel 
Joe McPhee - tenor saxophone, trumpet
Clifford Thornton - baritone horn, cornet
Byron Morris - alto saxophone, soprano saxophone
Mike Kull - piano
Harold E. Smith - percussion

References 

Joe McPhee live albums
1996 live albums
Hathut Records live albums